6 Aurigae is a star in the constellation Auriga.  Its apparent magnitude is 6.48.

References

Auriga (constellation)
K-type giants
Aurigae, 06
Durchmusterung objects
1602
031780
023268
K-type supergiants